Jinsong Subdistrict is a subdistrict on the southwest corner of Chaoyang District, Beijing, China. As of 2020, it has a total population of 103,316.

The subdistrict's name Jinsong was from an old pine tree that used to be in this area.

History

Administrative Division 
As of 2021, there are 17 communities within Jinsong Subdistrict:

References 

Chaoyang District, Beijing
Subdistricts of Beijing